The Teresina Metro (Portuguese: Metrô de Teresina, commonly called Metrô, though it is technically not a metro system) in Teresina, the capital and largest city of the Brazilian state of Piauí, is a diesel commuter rail line operated by CMTP (Metropolitan Public Transport Company).

History 
The Teresina Metro was inaugurated on 15 August 1989, with the objective of establishing a high-capacity transport for the urban agglomeration of Teresina. The works were initiated at the end of 1989.

To reduce the costs of the system, the project uses the existing metre gauge rail line, which travels through Teresina. It was placed into a cut in the centre of the city, to reduce interference with road traffic. It adopted diesel train-sets sponsored by RFFSA, which covered the stretch between Porto Alegre and Uruguaiana, which has the metre gauge track.
Line 1 entered into trial operation in November 1990 and was launched commercially on 5 June 1991.

A new station under construction in the city centre was supposed to increase usage to 20,000 passengers daily since none of the other stations are in the center of the city nor do they have bus terminals at their stations (the majority of Teresina Metro stations are on narrow streets in poorer neighborhoods with little commercial activity). After the inauguration of the Engenheiro Alberto Tavares Silva/Bandeira station, daily ridership only increased to 8,000 in 2013. In comparison, the city bus system handles about 225,000 daily passengers.

The Teresina Metro has plans to expand since it currently serves no major shopping center (besides the Shopping da Cidade which is populated by street vendors), the local soccer stadium, bus station or airport.

Operations

System characteristics 
Eight stations formed mostly by surface track. One of the train sets has been completely modernised in 2006.

Line

See also 
 Cariri Metro

References

External links 
 Teresina Metro – official site

Transport in Piauí
Metre gauge railways in Brazil